Palookaville (also frequently appears as both Palooka-Ville and Palooka-ville) is a comic book written and drawn by cartoonist Gregory Gallant, better known as Seth, and published by Drawn & Quarterly.  The first issue appeared in April 1991 and it has been irregularly published ever since. The comics are generally portrayals filled with lost, lonely characters searching for meaning, often reaching back into the past.

The series and its creator have won multiple industry awards, including the 1997 Ignatz Award for Outstanding Artist and for Outstanding Graphic Novel or Collection (for the It's a Good Life If You Don't Weaken collection).

The first 19 issues were published in traditional comic book (pamphlet) format approximately annually (from 1991 to 2008), while the 20th issue (2010) was published in much-expanded book (hardcover) format, and is now planned to continue in this format annually or semiannually (21st issue scheduled for 2012), owing to changes in the American comic book market, specifically the decline in sales of single-issue comic books during the decade 2000–2010.

Publication history

{| class="wikitable"
|-
|colspan="4" style="text-align:center;font-weight:bold; "|Issues of Palookaville
|-
! style="background:#B0C4DE;" | #
! style="background:#B0C4DE;" | Date
! style="background:#B0C4DE;width:10em;" | Major Story
! style="background:#B0C4DE;width:20em;" | Notes
|-
|1
|April 1991
|
|
10th anniversary edition released in 2001 on smaller paper with silver cover
|-
|2
|September 1991
|
|
|-
|3
|June 1993
|
|
|-
|4
|December 1993
|rowspan="6"|It's a Good Life, If You Don't Weaken
|
|-
|5
|May 1994
|
|-
|6
|November 1994
|
|-
|7
|April 1995
|
|-
|8
|December 1995
|
|-
|9
|June 1996
|
|-
|10
|April 1997
|rowspan="14"|Clyde Fans
|
|-
|11
|October 1997
|
|-
|12
|May 1998
|
|-
|13
|July 1999
|
|-
|14
|May 2000
|
|-
|15
|May 2001
|
|-
|16
|February 2003
|
|-
|17
|2004
|
|-
|18
|October 2005
|
|-
|19
|2008
|
|-
|20
|October 2010
|
First hardcover issue
|-
|21
|October 2013
|
|-
|22
|April 2015
|
|-
|23
|July 2017
|
|-
|}

References

Further reading

External links
 Palooka-Ville at the GCD
 preview of Palokaville #20 at Drawn & Quarterly's website

1991 comics debuts
Canadian comics
Canadian graphic novels
Comics by Seth (cartoonist)
Drawn & Quarterly titles